Eudesmia lunaris is a moth of the family Erebidae first described by Francis Walker in 1864. It is found in Colombia.

References

Eudesmia
Moths described in 1864